A list of American films released in 1905.

See also
 1905 in the United States

External links

1905 films at the Internet Movie Database

1905
Films
 American
1900s in American cinema